Wadhwa or Wadhwani/Wadhwaney is a surname of Indian origin.

Notable people with the name include:
 Anubhav Wadhwa, Indian entrepreneur
 Deepak Wadhwa, Indian actor
 Inderpreet Wadhwa, Indian-American renewable energy entrepreneur
 Mahendra Lal Wadhwa, Indian revolutionary
 Manish Wadhwa, Indian actor
 Meenakshi Wadhwa, American scientist
 Nirbhay Wadhwa, Indian actor
 Rajindar Pal Wadhwa, Indian scientist
 Romesh Wadhwani, Indian-American billionaire entrepreneur
 Shashi Wadhwa, Indian neuroscientist, dean of All India Institutes of Medical Sciences, Delhi
 Silvia Wadhwa, German financial journalist
 Vivek Wadhwa, Indian-American entrepreneur and academic

See also
 Wadhwani
 Wadhawan

Surnames of Indian origin
Indian surnames
Punjabi-language surnames
Hindu surnames
Khatri clans
Khatri surnames
Arora clans